Urmeniș is a commune in Bistrița-Năsăud County, Transylvania, Romania. It is composed of ten villages: Câmp, Coșeriu, Delureni (Mezőújlak), Fânațe (Szarvadi szénafűdűlő), Podenii (Kisújlak), Scoabe, Șopteriu (Septér), Urmeniș, Valea (Fundáta) and Valea Mare (Völgytanya).

Natives
Alexandru Dobra

References

Communes in Bistrița-Năsăud County
Localities in Transylvania